St. Thomas School is an educational institution(school) founded in 1967 by the Marthoma Educational Society Bihar of the Marthoma Syrian Church in Ranchi, Jharkhand, India. The school started in 1972 with the first batch taking the ICSE examinations in 1982. It is registered under the Marthoma Educational Society which has been managing the school since 1973. Currently, its principal is Rev. DR. M. O. Oommen JR. the school has classes from kindergarten to standard tenth with six sections in standard tenth from section A to section F. The school has a good reputation in not only the city of Ranchi but also in the state of Jharkhand for providing quality education.

See also
Education in India
Literacy in India
List of schools in India

References

External links

https://maps.app.goo.gl/cfE83PW5Jam5znCG6

Christian schools in Jharkhand
Schools in Ranchi